Hamilton Central was the name of a now-defunct railway station on the East Coast Main Trunk line which runs through the city of Hamilton in the Waikato region of New Zealand. The station was located in Hamilton's CBD and was made an underground station for the latter years of its existence before being closed. The underground platform still exists.

For most of the time since a station opened on the site in 1879, it was named Hamilton. It had closed to regular passenger services when the present Hamilton station opened in 1975, so there was little need for formal renaming. There have been several proposals to reopen the station, often using the name 'Hamilton Central'.

The East Coast Main Trunk line is still well used by freight trains. In 2018, 163 trains a week passed through, 36 between 8am and 5pm weekdays, 90 of them outside those hours and 37 at weekends.

History 
The station probably opened as Hamilton on 22 March 1879, with a lean-to station building, though in July 1879 it was said that it should take about a month to complete the extension. It only had 282 passengers in the year 1880/81 and closed on 19 February 1881. Probably it was affected by delays in opening Claudelands bridge; the   Eureka contract to Morrinsville was signed on 5 December 1883, though tenders had been invited over two years earlier.

On 1 October 1884 the station reopened as Hamilton West, when the Morrinsville line opened. By 1884 it had a 4th class station building, platform, cart approach,  by  goods shed and loading bank. In 1896 there was also a stationmaster's house, urinals and a passing loop for 38 wagons. In 1892 the station got improved and increased accommodation, with further improvements in 1897, 1899 and 1900, when a verandah was added.

The station was renamed Hamilton from 1 March 1899. In 1902 it was described as being, "of wood and iron, and has a ladies' waiting room, a public lobby, stationmaster's room, a long passenger platform, and a large goods shed. Four trains pass the station daily, each way." In 1905 the stationmaster's house was shifted and a porters room, parcels office and store added. The luggage room and verandah were extended in 1909. In 1924 a new, larger storeroom at the Frankton end replaced one at the other end.

Work to underground the station began in 1961, with removal of sidings, a loading shelter and the goods shed. The line was lowered in 1964. Its platform was moved to a cutting from 1 September 1964. It lost its railcar service to Te Puke on 11 September 1967 and to Rotorua on 11 November 1968. It then lost its station building, which is now a café at Waikato University. In 1969 a new 3-storey,  Administration Building opened, built by Holm Construction Ltd. for the Ministry of Works and linked by a covered walkway to the Road Services terminal in Ward Street and the underground rail platform. By the mid-1970s most of the station had been covered by carparks, which were later covered by the Centre Place shopping centre. When the current Hamilton station opened on 6 August 1975, the rarely used platform was renamed Hamilton Travel Centre.

The station was once served by several named trains, including the Rotorua, Geyserland, Thames and Taneatua Expresses.

Traffic grew to a peak in World War 2, as shown in the graph and table below.

New Zealand's first underground station 

Level crossings at Lake Rd, Seddon St and Victoria St, and rising population and levels of rail and road traffic, resulted in re-routing proposals from 1912, when council suggested the line could be lowered. It was turned down again in 1919, proposed as a diversion south of Frankton in 1929 and costed at £529,000 in 1938.

The National Roads Board then opted for it and, in September 1959, the Ministry of Works started the project. The platform was lowered about  into a cut & cover tunnel approached on 1 in 80 gradients, with road over-bridges at River Rd, Tristram/Hinemoa, Seddon Streets and Lake Rd. The new route and platform opened on 19 September 1964, after which Anglesea St was extended north of Ward St.

An NZR bus station (replaced by the Transport Centre in 2001) was built on top of the station, with a ramp link to it. The underground station was used by the Kaimai Express and Geyserland Express from when they started running in December 1991 until 1994 when the station was closed due to vandalism and concerns about passenger safety. The ramp was closed when the Warehouse was built in 2004, though a plan had been prepared to maintain access.

In 2020 reopening, possibly with 3 tracks and possibly just to the west, in Seddon Park, was put forward as a COVID-19 recovery scheme, as part of schemes to upgrade services to Auckland and relay tracks to Cambridge.

References

External links 
 1905 express at station, which now has a canopy and lights
1938 aerial view showing Anglesea St ending at the station
1965 low level platform and ramp to the original station building and station building
 NZR bus station, built on top of station
 underground platform with working lights and little graffiti

Buildings and structures in Hamilton, New Zealand
Railway stations opened in 1879
Rail transport in Waikato
Defunct railway stations in New Zealand
Railway stations located underground